599 9 specifically for Curaçao)International Call Prefix: 00

The country code +599 was assigned to the Netherlands Antilles (dissolved in 2010), and is now in use by Curaçao and the Caribbean Netherlands (Bonaire, Sint Eustatius and Saba).

Aruba and Sint Maarten, also former parts of the Netherlands Antilles, discontinued using the code in 1986 and 2011 respectively. Aruba now uses country code +297, and Sint Maarten uses the North American Numbering Plan (NANP) country code +1 with area code 721.

Area codes 
Originally each island had an area code each with the length of the local numbering varying from island to island (Curaçao had six while Bonaire had only four), however beginning in 1999, the numbers were modified so that each local number was seven digits long. This change left the islands without any area codes, except for Curaçao, which has the area code of 9 along with the seven digit local number.

Sint Maarten joins NANP

On 2 October 2009, the North American Numbering Plan Administration (NANPA) announced that it had approved the request of Sint Maarten's government to join the NANP and had assigned the territory area code 721. Effective 30 September 2011, Sint Maarten's country code changed to the NANP standard of +1. A permissive dialing period of one full year (to 30 September 2012) was in place when both area code 721 and +599 could be used.  Use of  +1-721 is now mandatory; a recorded message reminding callers to the +599 numbers to use +1-721 remained active until 30 September 2013.

Historic list of area codes and number ranges

See also
Telephone numbers in Aruba
Telephone numbers in the Netherlands

Notes and references

Curacao
Communications in Curaçao
Communications in the Netherlands Antilles
Netherlands Antilles-related lists
Communications in the Dutch Caribbean